Marcipa is a genus of moths of the family Erebidae.

References

Natural History Museum Lepidoptera genus database

Anobinae